The 1996 Tulsa Golden Hurricane football team represented the University of Tulsa during the 1996 NCAA Division I-A football season. In their ninth year under head coach David Rader, the Golden Hurricane compiled a 4–7 record. In the team's first season as members of the Western Athletic Conference the team finished seventh in the Mountain Divsision with a 2–6 conference record.  The team's statistical leaders included quarterback Troy DeGar with 1,336 passing yards, Reggie Williams with 759 rushing yards, and Wes Caswell with 817 receiving yards.

Schedule

References

Tulsa
Tulsa Golden Hurricane football seasons
Tulsa Golden Hurricane football